Nenad Buljan (born January 13, 1978 in Zagreb) is a freestyle swimmer from Croatia, who made his Olympic debut for his native country at the 2004 Summer Olympics in Athens, Greece. There he competed in the 400 m and 1500 m Freestyle, but was eliminated in the heats of both events.

External links
 Short profile on Croatian Olympic Committee

1978 births
Living people
Croatian male freestyle swimmers
Olympic swimmers of Croatia
Swimmers at the 2004 Summer Olympics
Swimmers from Zagreb
20th-century Croatian people
21st-century Croatian people